Willagee is an electoral district of the Legislative Assembly in the Australian state of Western Australia. The district is located in the southern suburbs of Perth.

Willagee has at all times been a safe Labor seat.

Geography
Willagee is an electorate in Perth's south, to the east and south-east of Fremantle. It includes:

 the suburbs of Willagee, Kardinya and Murdoch from the City of Melville;
 the suburbs of O'Connor and Samson from the City of Fremantle;
 the suburbs of Coolbellup, Bibra Lake, North Lake and South Lake from the City of Cockburn.

History
Willagee was first created at the 1994 redistribution ahead of the 1996 state election. It was won by Labor candidate Alan Carpenter, who later served as Minister for Education and other portfolios in the Gallop Ministry. Following Geoff Gallop's retirement from politics in January 2006, Carpenter became Premier, which he remained until the 2008 state election, at which Labor lost its majority. He retired from politics effective 2 October 2009 and the resulting by-election, held on 28 November, was won by Labor candidate Peter Tinley.

Members for Willagee

Election results

References

External links
 ABC election profiles: 2005 2008
 WAEC district maps: current boundaries, previous distributions

Willagee